Mandolin Abstractions is an album by American musicians David Grisman and Andy Statman, released in 1983.

Additional tracks on the CD reissue included "Japanese Sunrise", "Blackie and Sunburst", "Crosby, Stills and Nash", "Song of the Dawg" and "Ballad of Ouzo".

Track listing 
All compositions by David Grisman and Andy Statman unless otherwise noted.
 "Overture" – 7:29
 "Apassionata" – 3:46
 "Japanese Sunrise" – 8:29
 "Two White Boys Watching James Brown at the Apollo" – 2:26
 "Blackie and Sunburst" – 4:31
 "Crosby, Stills and Nash" – 2:05
 "Journey to the Center of Twang" – 5:01
 "Ode to Jim McReynolds" – 2:29
 "March of the Mandolas, Pt. 1" – 7:31
 "March of the Mandolas, Pt. 2" – 9:28
 "Song of the Dawg" (Grisman) – 2:35
 "Ballade of Ouzo" (Statman) – 5:32
 "'Til We Meet Again" – 3:28

Personnel 
 David Grisman – mandolin, mandola
 Andy Statman – mandolin, mandola, mandocello
Production notes:
 David Grisman – producer
 Howard Johnston – engineer, mixing
 Craig Miller – engineer, mixing
 Greg Fulginiti - original mastering
 Tom Coyne – mastering
 Ted Sharpe – design
 Arthur Stern – cover art

References 

David Grisman live albums
1983 live albums